The Forgotten is an American crime drama television series which premiered on September 22, 2009 on ABC. On November 9, 2009, ABC ordered five additional episodes of the series, bringing the first season's total to eighteen episodes. The final two episodes of The Forgotten aired on July 3, 2010.

The Forgotten was rated R16 in New Zealand for graphic violence and sex scenes.

Premise
A group of dedicated, amateur detectives, the members of the Forgotten Network (referred to in the pilot as the Identity Network), attempt to reconstruct the pieces of these John and Jane Does' lives from what little evidence is left behind. Each episode is narrated by a "body" who watches the team as they pursue the tantalizingly difficult challenge of figuring out who this victim once was. Why would anyone volunteer for such a grim task? As new recruit Tyler Davies quickly discovers, each of the members of the team has his or her own reasons for volunteering for the Network. Alex Donovan is a former cop, whose then eight-year-old daughter was kidnapped two years ago and has never been found. Lindsey Drake, the woman who runs the network from her home, is a virtual recluse whose husband is a convicted murderer. Walter Bailey does stake outs—when he is not blowing his cover. Candace Butler hates her day job. She also happens to have a special gift for putting people at ease—even the prickly Tyler, a talented sculptor with a background in forensics, a medical school drop-out, who initially joined the team to fulfill a sentence of 200 hours of community service after being apprehended defacing buildings.

Cast

 Christian Slater as Alex Donovan
 Heather Stephens as Lindsey Drake (episodes 1–13)
 Michelle Borth as Candace Butler
 Anthony Carrigan as Tyler Davies
 Bob Stephenson as Walter Bailey
 Rochelle Aytes as Grace Russell
 Elisha Cuthbert as Maxine Denver (episodes 12–17)

Episodes
In addition to the 17 regular episodes produced with the cast listed, an "Original Pilot" was previously filmed with different actors in some of the roles. Rupert Penry-Jones played Alex Donovan, and Reiko Aylesworth played Linda Manning (replaced by Heather Stephens as Lindsey Drake).

Pilot

Season 1 (2009–10)

International broadcasting

References

External links

 
 Hollywood Reporter review
 

2000s American crime drama television series
2010s American crime drama television series
2009 American television series debuts
2010 American television series endings
Television shows set in Chicago
2000s American police procedural television series
2010s American police procedural television series
Television series by Warner Bros. Television Studios
American Broadcasting Company original programming